Butor is a commune in the Grigoriopol District of Transnistria, Moldova. It is composed of two villages, Butor and India (Индия). It is currently under the administration of the breakaway government of the Transnistrian Moldovan Republic.

References

Communes of Transnistria
Kherson Governorate